Chastity, also known as purity, is a virtue related to temperance. Someone who is chaste refrains either from sexual activity considered immoral or any sexual activity, according to their state of life. In some contexts, for example when making a vow of chastity, chastity means the same as celibacy.

Etymology
The words chaste and chastity stem from the Latin adjective  ("cut off", "separated", "pure"). The words entered the English language around the middle of the 13th century. Chaste meant "virtuous", "pure from unlawful sexual intercourse") or (from the early 14th century on) as a noun, a virgin, while chastity meant "(sexual) purity".

Thomas Aquinas links  (chastity) to the Latin verb  ("chastise, reprimand, correct"), with a reference to Aristotle's Nicomachean Ethics: "Chastity takes its name from the fact that reason 'chastises' concupiscence, which, like a child, needs curbing, as the Philosopher states".

In Abrahamic religions 
For many Jews, Christians, and Muslims, acts of sexual nature are restricted to marriage. For unmarried persons, chastity is equivalent to sexual abstinence. Sexual acts outside of or apart from marriage, such as adultery, fornication, masturbation, and prostitution, are considered immoral due to lust.

Christianity

Traditions

In many Christian traditions, chastity is synonymous with purity. The Catholic Church teaches that chastity involves, in the words of cardinal bishop Alfonso López Trujillo, "the successful integration of sexuality within the person and thus the inner unity of man in his bodily and spiritual being", which according to one's marital status requires either having no sexual relationship, or only having sexual relations with one’s spouse. In Western Christian morality, chastity is placed opposite the deadly sin of lust, and is classified as one of seven virtues. The moderation of sexual desires is required to be virtuous. Reason, will, and desire can harmoniously work together to do what is good.

As an emblem of inward chastity, some Christians choose to wear a cord, girdle or a cincture of one of the several Confraternities of the Cord or a purity ring. The cord is worn as a symbol of chastity in honour to a chaste saint who is asked for intercession. The purity ring is worn before holy matrimony by those who marry or for the rest of their lives by those who stay single.

Marital chastity

In marriage, the spouses commit to a lifelong relationship that excludes sexual intimacy with other persons. A third form of chastity, often called "vidual chastity", is expected of a woman for a period after her husband dies. For example, Anglican Bishop Jeremy Taylor defined 5 rules in Holy Living (1650), including abstaining from marrying "so long as she is with child by her former husband" and "within the year of mourning".

Celibacy

In the Roman Catholic Church, celibacy is vowed or promised as one of the evangelical counsels by the persons of the consecrated life. Furthermore, in 306, the Synod of Elvira proscribed clergy from marrying. This was unevenly enforced until the Second Lateran Council in 1139 and found its way into canon law. Unmarried deacons promise celibacy to their local bishop when ordained.

Eastern Catholic priests are permitted to marry, provided they do so before ordination and outside monastic life.

Vows of chastity

Vows of chastity can be taken either as part of an organised religious life (such as Roman Catholic Beguines and Beghards in the past) or on an individual basis: as a voluntary act of devotion, or as part of an ascetic lifestyle (often devoted to contemplation), or both. Some Protestant religious communities, such as the Bruderhof, take vows of chastity as part of the church membership process.

Teaching by denomination

Catholicism
Chastity is a central and pivotal concept in Roman Catholic praxis. Chastity's importance in traditional Roman Catholic teaching stems from the fact that it is regarded as essential in maintaining and cultivating the unity of body with spirit and thus the integrity of the human being. It is also regarded as fundamental to the practise of the Catholic life because it involves an apprenticeship in self-mastery. By attaining mastery over one's passions, reason, will, and desire can harmoniously work together to do what is good.

Lutheranism
The theology of the body of the Lutheran Churches emphasizes the role of the Holy Spirit, who has sanctified the bodies of Christians to be God's temple.

Many Lutheran monks and Lutheran nuns practice celibacy, though in other Lutheran religious orders it is not compulsory.

The Church of Jesus Christ of Latter-Day Saints

In the Church of Jesus Christ of Latter-day Saints chastity is very important:

"Physical intimacy between husband and wife is a beautiful and sacred part of God's plan for His children. It is an expression of love within marriage and allows husband and wife to participate in the creation of life. God has commanded that this sacred power be expressed only between a man and a woman who are legally married. The law of chastity applies to both men and women. It includes strict abstinence from sexual relations before marriage and complete fidelity and loyalty to one's spouse after marriage."

"The law of chastity requires that sexual relations be reserved for marriage between a man and a woman.

"In addition to reserving sexual intimacy for marriage, we obey the law of chastity by controlling our thoughts, words, and actions. Jesus Christ taught, "Ye have heard that it was said by them of old time, Thou shalt not commit adultery: but I say unto you, That whosoever looketh on a woman to lust after her hath committed adultery with her already in his heart" (Matthew 5:27–28)."

Teachings of the Church of Jesus Christ of Latter-Day Saints also include that sexual expression within marriage is an important dimension of spousal bonding apart from but not necessarily avoiding its procreative result.

Islam

Quran
The most famous personal example of chastity in the Quran is the Virgin Mary (Mariam):

"And [mention] the one who guarded her chastity, so We blew into her [garment] through Our angel [Gabriel], and We made her and her son a sign for the worlds." (21 :91)

"And she took, in seclusion from them, a screen. Then We sent to her Our Angel, and he represented himself to her as a well-proportioned man. She said, "Indeed, I seek refuge in the Most Merciful from you, [so leave me], if you should be fearing of Allah." He said, "I am only the messenger of your Lord to give you [news of] a pure boy." She said, "How can I have a boy while no man has touched me and I have not been unchaste?"" (19:17–20)

Extramarital sex is forbidden. The Quran says:

"And do not approach unlawful sexual intercourse. Indeed, it is ever an immorality and is evil as a way." (17:32)

"And those who do not invoke with Allah another deity or kill the soul which Allah has forbidden [to be killed], except by right, and do not commit unlawful sexual intercourse And whoever should do that will meet a penalty. Multiplied for him is the punishment on the Day of Resurrection, and he will abide therein humiliated – Except for those who repent, believe and do righteous work. For them Allah will replace their evil deeds with good. And ever is Allah Forgiving and Merciful." (25:68–70)

In a list of commendable deeds the Quran says:

"Indeed, the Muslim men and Muslim women, the believing men and believing women, the obedient men and obedient women, the truthful men and truthful women, the patient men and patient women, the humble men and humble women, the charitable men and charitable women, the fasting men and fasting women, the men who guard their private parts and the women who do so, and the men who remember Allah often and the women who do so – for them Allah has prepared forgiveness and a great reward." (33:35)

Because the sex desire is usually attained before a man is financially capable of marriage, the love to God and mindfulness of Him should be sufficient motive for chastity:

"But let them who find not [the means for] marriage abstain [from sexual relations] until Allah enriches them from His bounty. And those who seek a contract [for eventual emancipation] from among whom your right hands possess – then make a contract with them if you know there is within them goodness and give them from the wealth of Allah which He has given you. And do not compel your slave girls to prostitution, if they desire chastity, to seek [thereby] the temporary interests of worldly life. And if someone should compel them, then indeed, Allah is [to them], after their compulsion, Forgiving and Merciful." (24:33)

Sharia (Law)
Chastity is mandatory in Islam. Sex outside legitimacy is prohibited, for both men and women whether married or unmarried. The injunctions and forbiddings in Islam apply equally to men and women. The legal punishment for adultery is equal for men and women.  Social hypocrisy in many societies over history had led to a double standard when considering sin committed by men versus sin committed by women. Society tended to be more lenient and permissive towards men forgiving men for sins not forgivable when women do them.

The prophet's prescription to the youth was:

Those of you who own the means should marry for this should keep their eyes uncraving and their chastity secure. Those who don't, may practise fasting for it curbs desire. " (Ibn Massoud)

Chastity is an attitude and a way of life. In Islam it is both a personal and a social value. A Muslim society should not condone relations entailing or conducive to sexual license. Social patterns and practices calculated to inflame sexual desire are frowned upon by Islam, such incitements to immorality including  permissive ideologies, titillating works of art and the failure to inculcate sound moral principles in the young. At the heart of such a view of human sexuality lies the conviction that the notion of personal freedom should never be misconstrued as the freedom to flout God's laws by overstepping the bounds which, in His infinite wisdom, He has set upon the relations of the sexes.

Baháʼí Faith
Chastity is highly prized in the Baháʼí Faith. Similar to other Abrahamic religions, Baháʼí teachings call for the restriction of sexual activity to that between a wife and husband in Baháʼí marriage, and discourage members from using pornography or engaging in sexually explicit recreational activities. The concept of chastity is extended to include avoidance of alcohol and mind-altering drugs, profanity, and gaudy or immodest attire.

In Eastern religions

Hinduism
Hinduism's view on premarital sex is rooted in its concept of Ashrama (stage) or the stages of life. The first of these stages, known as Brahmacharya, roughly translates as chastity. Celibacy and chastity are considered the appropriate behavior for both male and female students during this stage, which precedes the stage of the married householder (Grihastha). Sanyasis and Hindu monks or Sadhus are also celibate as part of their ascetic discipline.

Sikhism
In Sikhism, premarital or extramarital sex is strictly forbidden. However, it is encouraged to marry and live as a family unit to provide and nurture children for the perpetual benefit of creation (as opposed to Sannyasa or living as a monk, which was, and remains, a common spiritual practice in India). A Sikh is encouraged not to live as a recluse, beggar, monk, nun, celibate, or in any similar vein.

Jainism 
The Jain ethical code contains the vow of brahmacarya (meaning "pure conduct"), which prescribes the expectations for Jains concerning sexual activity. Brahmacarya is one of the five major and minor vows of Jainism, prescribing slightly different expectations for ascetics and laypeople, respectively.

Complete celibacy is expected only of Jain ascetics (who are also referred to as monks and nuns). For laypeople, chastity is expected, with extramarital sex and adultery being prohibited.

Buddhism

The teachings of Buddhism include the Noble Eightfold Path, comprising a division called right action. Under the Five Precepts ethical code, Upāsaka and Upāsikā lay followers should abstain from sexual misconduct, while Bhikkhu and Bhikkhuni monastics should practice strict chastity.

Taoism 
The Five Precepts of the Taoist religion include No Sexual Misconduct, which is interpreted as prohibiting extramarital sex for lay practitioners and marriage or sexual intercourse for monks and nuns.

See also 

 Law of chastity
 Ten Commandments
 Theology of the body

References

External links 

Catechism of the Catholic Church (III.2.I) (archived 4 March 2009)
Early Shaker Writings Relating to Sexual Abstinence
Catholic Encyclopedia: Chastity

Virtue
Seven virtues
Philosophy of love
Sexual abstinence
Fruit of the Holy Spirit